Walter Mathers Rutherford (23 September 1857 – 15 October 1913 in Jedburgh) was a Scottish golfer who competed in the 1900 Summer Olympics. He won the silver medal in the men's competition with a score of 168 over 36 holes.

He was educated at Madras College in St Andrews. In later years he farmed land at Jedburgh and was a vocal proponent of land reform.

References

External links

Walter Rutherford at Sports Reference.com
 

Scottish male golfers
Amateur golfers
Olympic golfers of Great Britain
Golfers at the 1900 Summer Olympics
Scottish Olympic medallists
Olympic medalists in golf
Olympic silver medallists for Great Britain
Medalists at the 1900 Summer Olympics
People educated at Madras College
Sportspeople from the Scottish Borders
1857 births
1913 deaths